Kazakhstan competed at the 2020 Winter Youth Olympics in Lausanne, Switzerland from 9 to 22 January 2020.

Alpine skiing

Boys

Girls

Biathlon

Boys

Girls

Mixed

Cross-country skiing 

Boys

Girls

Freestyle skiing 

Ski cross

Ice hockey

Mixed NOC 3x3 tournament 

Boys
Alexei Baidek

Girls
Kristina Chernova

Nordic combined 

Individual

Short track speed skating

Boys

Girls

Ski jumping

Boys

Girls

Speed skating

Boys

Girls

Mass Start

Mixed

See also
Kazakhstan at the 2020 Summer Olympics

References

2020 in Kazakhstani sport
Nations at the 2020 Winter Youth Olympics
Kazakhstan at the Youth Olympics